Opinion polling was carried out prior to the 2018 Mexican general election.

The 2018 Mexican election features nine registered political parties, including the Institutional Revolutionary Party (PRI), National Action Party (PAN), Party of the Democratic Revolution (PRD), and the newly formed National Regeneration Movement (Morena).

Coalition backgrounds

Todos por México
PRI, which held the presidency from 1929 to 2000 and is currently in power under President Peña Nieto, is primarily a center-right party. It will be contesting the elections in a coalition alongside the Ecological Green Party of Mexico and the New Alliance Party (Mexico) under the coalition "Todos por México" ("Everyone for Mexico").

Por México al Frente
PAN is a center-right, Christian democracy party which held the presidency in 2 sexenios from 2000-2012.

PRD grew out of the PRI in 1986 as the leftists who created the Corriente Democrática (Democratic Current) within PRI split off. It came quite close to claiming the presidency in 2006. Surprisingly, the PRD decided to form a coalition with the right-wing PAN, and they will contest the elections alongside Citizens' Movement in a coalition called "Por México al Frente" ("For Mexico, to the Front").

Juntos Haremos Historia
MORENA, created in 2014 by Andrés Manuel López Obrador, affectionately called AMLO, is a left-leaning party which split from the PRD. It will contest the elections as a coalition with the Labor Party (PT) and the Social Encounter Party (PES), called "Juntos Haremos Historia" ("Together we'll make history").

By coalitions

By candidates (January–June 2018)

By candidates (April–December 2017)

By political parties

References

External links
National Electoral Institute (in Spanish)

Opinion polling in Mexico